Cyamemazine (Tercian), also known as cyamepromazine, is a typical antipsychotic drug of the phenothiazine class which was introduced by Theraplix in France in 1972 and later in Portugal as well.

Medical use
It is used for the treatment of schizophrenia and, especially, for psychosis-associated anxiety, due to its unique anxiolytic efficacy.

It is also used to reduce anxiety associated with benzodiazepine withdrawal syndrome and anxiety in depression with suicidal tendency.

Side effects
Here are some of the most common side effects and related incidence:
 Sedation (20%)
 Vertigo (7.9%)
 Constipation (4%)
 Dyskinesia (4.4%)
 Dryness of mouth (5.9%)
 Hypotension (7.4%)
 Tachycardia (3.2%)

Mechanism
Cyamemazine differs from other phenothiazine neuroleptics in that aside from the usual profile of dopamine, α1-adrenergic, H1, and mACh receptor antagonism, it additionally produces potent blockade of several serotonin receptors, including 5-HT2A, 5-HT2C, and 5-HT7. These actions have been implicated in cyamemazine's anxiolytic effects (5-HT2C) and lack of extrapyramidal side effects (5-HT2A), and despite being classified as a typical antipsychotic, it actually behaves like an atypical antipsychotic.

Synthesis

2-Cyanophenothiazine [38642-74-9] (1)
3-Chloro-2-methylpropyl(dimethyl)amine [23349-86-2] (2)

References 

Alpha-1 blockers
Dimethylamino compounds
Dopamine antagonists
H1 receptor antagonists
Muscarinic antagonists
Nitriles
Phenothiazines
Serotonin receptor antagonists
Typical antipsychotics